Glushkov, Gloushkov, and Glouchkov; feminine: Glushkova is a Russian surname.  Notable people with the name include:

 Aleksei Glushkov (born 1975), Russian Olympic bronze medalist wrestler
 Anastasia Gloushkov (born 1985), Israeli Olympic synchronized swimmer
 Irina Glushkova (born 1952), Soviet and Russian indologist and philologist
 Georgi Glouchkov (born 1960), Bulgarian basketball player
 Nikita Glushkov (born 1994), Russian football player
 Nikita Glushkov (born 1992), Russian football player
 Nikolai Glushkov (1949–2018), Russian businessman, Deputy Director-General of Aeroflot
 Victor Glushkov (1923–1982), Ukrainian founding father of information technology and a founder of cybernetics
 Yekaterina Glushkova (born 1981), Kazakhstani water polo player

See also
 Glushko

Russian-language surnames
Bulgarian-language surnames